Jim Jarrett (born July 1938) is an American former college athletics administrator.  He was the athletic director at Old Dominion University for 40 years, from 1970 to 2010. He attended Southern Illinois University on a tennis scholarship and later received a Ph.D. from Florida State University. He was first hired by Old Dominion as an associate professor in the physical education department. During his tenure, Old Dominion teams won 28 national championships, including women's basketball championships in 1979, 1980, and 1985, and field hockey championships in 1982, 1983, 1984, 1988, 1990, 1991, 1992, 1998, and 2000.

References

External links
 Old Dominion profile

1938 births
Living people
Florida State University alumni
Old Dominion Monarchs athletic directors
Old Dominion University faculty
Southern Illinois University alumni